Irządze  is a village in Zawiercie County, Silesian Voivodeship, in southern Poland. It is the seat of the gmina (administrative district) called Gmina Irządze.

The village has a population of 840.

References

Villages in Zawiercie County